Jure Balkovec (born 9 September 1994) is a Slovenian footballer who plays as a defender for Turkish club Alanyaspor.

Notes

References

External links
Jure Balkovec at NZS 

1994 births
Living people
Sportspeople from Novo Mesto
Slovenian footballers
Slovenia youth international footballers
Slovenia under-21 international footballers
Slovenia international footballers
Association football fullbacks
NK Bela Krajina players
NK Domžale players
NK Krka players
NK Radomlje players
S.S.C. Bari players
Hellas Verona F.C. players
Empoli F.C. players
Fatih Karagümrük S.K. footballers
Alanyaspor footballers
Slovenian Second League players
Slovenian PrvaLiga players
Serie B players
Süper Lig players
Slovenian expatriate footballers
Slovenian expatriate sportspeople in Italy
Expatriate footballers in Italy
Slovenian expatriate sportspeople in Turkey
Expatriate footballers in Turkey